gov.uk (styled on the site as GOV.UK) is a United Kingdom public sector information website, created by the Government Digital Service to provide a single point of access to HM Government services. The site launched as a beta on 31 January 2012, following on from the Alphagov project. The website utilises a modified digital version of the Transport typeface called New Transport. It officially replaced Directgov and the online services of Business Link on 17 October 2012. , GOV.UK is the second most used government website worldwide, after Russia's .

The website was planned to replace the individual websites of hundreds of government departments and public bodies by 2014. By 1 May 2013, all 24 ministerial departments had their URLs redirecting to gov.uk. As of March 2022, GOV.UK hosts pages for 23 ministerial departments, 20 non-ministerial departments, and over 410 agencies, public corporations, and other public bodies.

History 
The first ministerial departments and other organisations moved to the Inside Government section of gov.uk on 15 November 2012. On 12 December 2012, a further three departments migrated, bringing the total of ministerial departments to six out of a total of 24. By 1 May 2013, all 24 ministerial departments, as well as UK embassies around the world, had transferred to gov.uk.

On 16 April 2013, gov.uk won Design of the Year 2013 at the Design Museum awards. The Government Digital Service has also won a D&AD "Black Pencil" award for their work. In 2019, gov.uk won a D&AD "Wood Pencil" award for its Step-by-Step digital design pattern.

In 2018, the Government Digital Service introduced the GOV.UK Design System, with the intention of having styles, components and patterns in a centralised location, to support government departments in utilising GOV.UK.

Alphagov

Alphagov was the project name of the experimental prototype website built by the Government Digital Service, which was launched on 11 May 2011 by the Cabinet Office. The website was open for public comment for two months, in order to judge the feasibility of a single domain for British Government web services.

Launched in response to the report by Martha Lane Fox, Directgov 2010 and Beyond: Revolution Not Evolution, published in November 2010, Alphagov sought to act as a proof of concept for the way citizens could interact with the government through a series of useful online tools, where they were more useful than published content alone.

As well as improving the 'citizen experience' of using government web services online, the project also identified the potential for £64 million in yearly savings on the central government's annual £128 million web publishing bill. The initial consultation period was completed in June 2011. A beta version was then created, which led to the launch of GOV.UK.

See also 

 Data.gov.uk
 Directgov

References

External links 
 
 data.gov.uk
 
 Accessibility.blog.gov.uk
 Government Digital Service
 Government Service Design Manual

2012 establishments in the United Kingdom
Government services web portals in the United Kingdom
Internet properties established in 2012
Government Digital Service